Piz Argient (3,945 m) is a mountain in the Bernina Range of the Alps on the border between Italy and the Swiss canton of Graubünden.

The peak is bounded to the north by the Morteratsch Glacier, to the west by the Upper Scerscen Glacier, and to the south and east by the Fellaria Glacier. It is separated from Piz Zupò to its east by the Fuorcla dal Zupò (3,851 m) and from Crast' Agüzza to its north-west by the Fuorcla da l'Argient (3,705 m).

Huts
 Marco e Rosa Hut (3,610 m) 
 Marinelli Hut (2,813 m)

References 

 Collomb, Robin, Bernina Alps, Goring: West Col Productions, 1988

External links
 The Bernina Group on SummitPost

Bernina Range
Engadin
Pontresina
Mountains of the Alps
Alpine three-thousanders
Mountains of Lombardy
Italy–Switzerland border
International mountains of Europe
Mountains of Switzerland
Mountains of Graubünden
Three-thousanders of Switzerland